Trey Phillips may refer to:

Trey Phillips (tennis) (born 1973), American tennis player
Trey Phillips, cast of Laguna Beach: The Real Orange County